The 1917 Cambridge by-election was held on 25 July 1917. The by-election was held due to the resignation of the incumbent Conservative MP, Almeric Paget.  It was won by the Conservative candidate Eric Geddes, who was coming in as First Lord of the Admiralty and who was unopposed due to a War-time electoral pact.

References

1917 elections in the United Kingdom
1917 in England
20th century in Cambridge
July 1917 events
Politics of Cambridge
History of Cambridge
By-elections to the Parliament of the United Kingdom in Cambridgeshire constituencies
Unopposed ministerial by-elections to the Parliament of the United Kingdom (need citation)